Yogue orthonairovirus, also called Yogue virus, is a species of virus in the genus Orthonairovirus. Its only known host is Rousettus aegyptiacus.

References

Nairoviridae